TLO, or Turun linja-autoilijain osakeyhtiö (Finnish for Turku Bus Operators Ltd) is a group of bus companies and the main operator of the regional public transport in the region of Turku, Finland. TLO was founded in 1954 by over fifty private bus companies. Since then, the number of companies in the group has shrunk to six.

On a normal day, 52 of the group's buses are in operation on lines between Turku and its neighbouring cities. The most important destinations of TLO's bus services are:
 Naantali (lines 6, 7, 201, 203)
 Raisio (lines 6, 7, 206, 220, 221, 300)
 the Mylly shopping centre (lines 220, 221, 300)
 Kuninkoja (lines 300, 301, 302, 303)
 Kaarina (lines 7, 221, 700, 701, 703-707, 801, 901-903)
 Piikkiö (lines 700, 701, 703-707)
 Paimio (lines 703-709)
 Pargas (lines 801, 901-903)
 Nagu, Korpo (lines 901-903)
 Lieto (line 6)
 Rusko (lines 301, 302, 303)
 Vahto (lines 302, 303)
 Merimasku, Rymättylä (line N2, N4 from Naantali)

Bus companies of Finland
Public transport in Finland
Transport in Turku